William Brough may refer to:
William Brough (priest) (died 1671), English royalist churchman
William Brough (writer) (1826–1870), English writer
William Edward Brough, of Brough Motorcycles
Bill Brough (born 1966), California politician